Agnes of Bavaria may refer to:

 Agnes of Bavaria, Margravine of Brandenburg-Stendal (1276–1345), a daughter of Louis II, Duke of Upper Bavaria
 Agnes of Bavaria (nun) (1335–1352), a daughter of Louis IV, Duke of Upper Bavaria